Blodgett is a census-designated place (CDP) and unincorporated community in Benton County, Oregon, United States, where Oregon Route 180 meets U.S. Route 20 in the Central Oregon Coast Range  west of Corvallis. It is near the confluence of the Tumtum and Marys rivers. As of the 2010 census, the community had a population of 58.

Blodgett was named for pioneer settler William Blodgett. The post office was established in April 1888 with the name "Emrick", for a local family, and was changed to Blodgett shortly thereafter. Its ZIP code is 97326.

Blodgett is part of the Philomath School District. The 38-student Blodgett Elementary School serves kindergarten through fourth grade; older students attend schools in nearby Philomath.

Demographics

Climate
This region experiences warm (but not hot) and dry summers, with no average monthly temperatures above .  According to the Köppen Climate Classification system, Blodgett has a warm-summer Mediterranean climate, abbreviated "Csb" on climate maps.

References

Populated places established in 1888
Unincorporated communities in Benton County, Oregon
Census-designated places in Oregon
1888 establishments in Oregon
Census-designated places in Benton County, Oregon
Unincorporated communities in Oregon